Menemerus mirabilis is a jumping spider species in the genus Menemerus that lives in Ethiopia. It was first described by Wanda Wesołowska in 1999.

References

Endemic fauna of Ethiopia
Spiders described in 1999
Fauna of Ethiopia
Salticidae
Spiders of Africa
Taxa named by Wanda Wesołowska